This is a list of cemeteries in Boone County, Missouri including the county seat of Columbia as well as the towns of Ashland, Centralia, Hallsville, Sturgeon, Rocheport and Harrisburg. The county contains over 260 known cemeteries. Generally this list does not include Native American burial sites unless they were buried in a European style cemetery. Notable cemeteries include Jewell Cemetery State Historic Site, Columbia Cemetery, and Mt. Zion Cemetery, all three on the National Register of Historic Places.

Undocumented cemeteries
Many cemeteries have been completely or partially destroyed sometimes by mistake but often intentionally. Markers, burials, and sometimes whole cemeteries have been moved. Others have been lost to time and locations forgotten or unknown. Small family plots, often with less than ten burials, are mostly commonly lost.

See also
National Register of Historic Places listings in Boone County, Missouri
Boone County Historical Society

References

Boone County
Boone County
Cemeteries
Cemeteries
Cemeteries
African-American history in Columbia, Missouri